Noah Bratschi (born July 31, 2000) is an American professional rock climber who specializes in competitive speed climbing and represents the United States at IFSC Climbing World Cups. He won the bronze medal at the 2021 International Federation of Sport Climbing (IFSC) World Championship in Moscow, Russia. With this accomplishment he became the first American speed climber to win a World Championship medal in thirty years (since 1991), and with that, he also became the first American to ever win a medal on the modern IFSC homologated speed climbing wall.

On May 20, 2022, at the IFSC World Cup in Salt Lake City, with his silver medal performance, Bratschi became the first ever American male speed climber to finish on the podium at a speed climbing World Cup. 

At the 2021 USA Climbing Team Trial Invitationals, Bratschi set an American record in speed climbing.  He was the 2022 North American Cup gold medalist, the silver medalist at the 2019 US Open National Championships and the bronze medalist at the 2022 US Open National Championships

As an accomplished youth competitor, he won silver medals at the 2018 IFSC World Youth Championships in Moscow, Russia and the 2017 Youth Pan American Championships in Montreal, Canada. He was the age group US Youth National Champion in 2015, 2016, 2017, 2018 and the 2019 silver medalist.

References

External links 
 Team USA profile
 IFSC profile

Living people
2000 births
People from Potomac, Maryland
American rock climbers
Sportspeople from Montgomery County, Maryland
Competitors at the 2022 World Games
21st-century American people
IFSC Climbing World Championships medalists
Speed climbers